Peter Cartwright may refer to:

 Peter Cartwright (revivalist) (1785–1872), American revivalist and politician
 Peter Cartwright (actor) (1935–2013), South African-born British actor
 Peter Cartwright (lawyer) (1940–2019), husband of the former Governor-General of New Zealand, Silvia Cartwright, and chair of the Broadcasting Standards Authority
 Peter Cartwright (footballer) (born 1957), English footballer
 Peter Cartwright (film editor) on The Angelic Conversation
 Peter Cartwright (ice hockey) in 2011 AIHL season